Youssouf Amouda Assogba (born 21 August 2001) is a Beninese professional footballer who plays as a right-back for French  club Amiens, and the Benin national team.

Club career
Assogba began his career with the youth academies APEC and Kraké in Benin. On 21 November 2019, Assogba signed with Amiens SC from Benin.

On 13 September 2021, he joined Boulogne on loan. On 30 March 2022, Assogba moved on a new loan to Jönköpings Södra in Sweden.

International career
Assogba debuted with the Benin national team in a friendly 2–1 win against Ivory Coast on 6 September 2020.

References

External links
 
 

2001 births
Living people
Beninese footballers
Benin international footballers
Association football fullbacks
USS Kraké players
Amiens SC players
US Boulogne players
Jönköpings Södra IF players
Ligue 2 players
Benin Premier League players
Championnat National 3 players
Championnat National players
Beninese expatriate footballers
Beninese expatriate sportspeople in France
Expatriate footballers in France
Beninese expatriate sportspeople in Sweden
Expatriate footballers in Sweden
People from Parakou